Genevieve is a 1953 British comedy film produced and directed by Henry Cornelius and written by William Rose. It stars John Gregson, Dinah Sheridan, Kenneth More and Kay Kendall as two couples comedically involved in a veteran automobile rally.

Plot
Two veteran cars and their crews are participating in the annual London to Brighton Veteran Car Run. Alan McKim (John Gregson), a young barrister, and his wife, Wendy (Dinah Sheridan), drive Genevieve, a 1904 Darracq. Their friend Ambrose Claverhouse (Kenneth More), a brash advertising salesman, his latest girlfriend, fashion model Rosalind Peters (Kay Kendall), and her pet St. Bernard ride in a 1905 Spyker.

The journey to Brighton goes well for Claverhouse, but the McKims' trip is complicated by several breakdowns, and they arrive very late. As Alan cancelled their accommodation in their usual plush hotel during a fit of pique, they are forced to spend the night in a dingy run-down hotel (with a cameo performance by Joyce Grenfell as the proprietress) leaving Wendy feeling less than pleased.

They finally join Ambrose and Rosalind for after-dinner drinks, but Rosalind gets very drunk, and insists on playing the trumpet with the house band. To the surprise of all, she performs a hot jazz solo before falling fast asleep moments later, to Wendy's great amusement. (Kendall mimes the performance of "Genevieve" to a rendition by jazz trumpeter Kenny Baker.)

Alan and Wendy have an argument over Ambrose's supposed romantic attentions to her, and Alan goes off to the garage to sulk. Whilst he works on his car in the middle of the night, Ambrose turns up. Angry words are exchanged, and Alan impulsively bets the other man £100 that he can beat Ambrose back to London, despite racing not being allowed by the club. Ambrose accepts the bet—"First over Westminster Bridge."

The following morning, despite Rosalind's massive hangover and Wendy's determined disapproval of the whole business, the two crews race back to London. Each driver is determined that his car is the better, come what may, and they both resort to various forms of cheating. Ambrose sabotages Alan's engine, and Alan causes Ambrose to be stopped by the police.

Finally, on the outskirts of London (West Drayton), both cars are stopped by traffic police and the four contestants are publicly warned after Alan and Ambrose almost come to blows. At Wendy's insistence, they decide to call off the bet and have a party instead. But whilst waiting for the pub to open, words are exchanged and the bet is on again.

The two cars race neck-and-neck through the southern suburbs of London. But with only a few yards to go, Genevieve breaks down. As Ambrose's car is about to overtake it, its tyres become stuck in tramlines (London's tram network had closed in 1952, but many of the tracks were still in evidence when the film was made that same year) and it drives off in another direction. The brakes on Genevieve fail, and the car rolls a few yards onto Westminster Bridge, thus winning the bet.

Cast

 John Gregson as Alan McKim
 Dinah Sheridan as Wendy McKim
 Kenneth More as Ambrose Claverhouse
 Kay Kendall as Rosalind Peters
 Geoffrey Keen as First traffic policeman
 Reginald Beckwith as J.C. Callahan
 Arthur Wontner as Elderly Gentleman
 Joyce Grenfell as Hotel proprietress
 Leslie Mitchell as Himself – Newsreel Commentator 
 Michael Balfour as Trumpeter (uncredited) 
 Stanley Escane as Newsreel cameraman (uncredited) 
 Fred Griffiths as Ice Cream Seller (uncredited)
 Charles Lamb as Publican (uncredited) 
 Arthur Lovegrove as Hotel doorman (uncredited) 
 Edward Malin as Spectator (uncredited)
 Edie Martin as Guest at Hotel (uncredited)
 Michael Medwin as Father-to-be (uncredited)
 Harold Siddons as Second traffic policeman (uncredited)
 Patrick Westwood as Motor mechanic (uncredited)

Production
Henry Cornelius had made  Passport to Pimlico for Ealing Studios, but had left the studio to go independent. He approached Michael Balcon to make Genevieve for Ealing. However, given that Cornelius' returning would disrupt the studio's production schedule, and that he had not won any friends at Ealing by leaving, Balcon turned the film down, leaving Cornelius to have his film made for Rank Studios.

Earl St John was originally not enthusiastic to make the movie but agreed to take it to the Rank Board if the budget could be kept to £115,000. J. Arthur Rank agreed to provide 70% of the finance if Cornelius could source the rest elsewhere; the director obtained the money from the National Film Finance Corporation.

The original choices for the male leads were Guy Middleton and Dirk Bogarde; they turned the film down, and their roles were given to Kenneth More and John Gregson respectively. Dinah Sheridan says that the studio wanted Claire Bloom to play her part. Sheridan was offered two other films around the same time (Grand National Night and Street Corner) and asked Dirk Bogarde for this advice:
He told me to take Genevieve if I got it. He had turned it down because he didn’t want to do comedy again. They didn’t want Kenneth More, they wanted Guy Middleton; they wanted Dirk instead of John Gregson, Claire Bloom instead of me and I can’t remember who they wanted instead of Kay Kendall. But we got on so well together and it worked. Ninety per cent of the credit must go to Bill Rose, a wonderful writer.
Kenneth More was appearing in the enormously successful production of The Deep Blue Sea when Henry Cornelius approached him to play the part of Ambrose. More said Cornelius never saw him in the play, but cast him on the basis of his work in an earlier film, The Galloping Major. More's fee was £3,500 or £4,000.

Filming took place between October 1952 and February 1953. More recalls "the shooting of the picture was hell. Everything went wrong, even the weather." More says because of Cornelius' perfectionism the film went over budget by £20,000.

Rutland Mews South, London SW7, was used during filming as the location for the home of Alan and Wendy.

The themes of the musical score were composed and performed by Larry Adler, and harmonised and orchestrated by composer Graham Whettam who wrote the orchestral scores incorporating Larry Adler's tunes. Dance numbers were added by Eric Rogers.

The comedic tone of Genevieve was established by the following disclaimer at the end of the opening credits:
 This was meant to underscore the fact that the actual event portrayed in the film is not a race.

Cars

The script for Genevieve originally called for the rivals to be driving British cars, Alan McKim a Wolseley or Humber, and Ambrose Claverhouse a Lanchester. No owners of such cars were willing to lend them for filming, and eventually Norman Reeves loaned his Darracq and Frank Reese his Spyker. The Darracq was originally named Annie, but was permanently renamed Genevieve after the film's success. Genevieve returned from a 34-year visit to Australia in 1992, and takes part in the London-Brighton Run every year. In July 2002, Genevieve and another Spyker participated in a 50th anniversary rally, touring the filming locations. Both Genevieve and Ambrose Claverhouse's Spyker were, on display at the Louwman Museum in The Hague.

Reception

Critical
Genevieve  was critically reviewed by Bosley Crowther for The New York Times, giving the film a very positive appraisal. "On the strength of the current mania that some restless people have for automobiles of ancient vintage—what are fondly called "veteran cars"—a British producer-director, Henry Cornelius, has made a film that may cautiously be recommended as one of the funniest farce comedies in years."

Box office
Genevieve was the second-most popular film at the British box office in 1953.

The film was released in the US by Universal. According to one report in Variety the film grossed $560,000 in the US. Other accounts in the same magazine give this figure as $450,000 or $400,000 of which $338,000 was returned to Britain. Nonetheless, John Davis placed an advertisement in the New York Times where he accused American distributors of putting films such as Genevieve, Simba, The Purple Plain and The Cruel Sea in art house cinemas instead of mainstream cinemas.

According to the National Film Finance Corporation, the film made a comfortable profit.

Genevieve initiated a cycle of other comedies from the Rank Organisation.

Awards and nominations

It's a Mad, Mad, Mad, Mad World
According to the commentary on the Criterion edition of It's a Mad, Mad, Mad, Mad World, nearly a decade later Rose used Genevieve as the basis for the former, another automobile comedy, but on a larger scale and set in Scotland. He sent an outline to Stanley Kramer, who as luck would have it was ready to make a comedy after a string of intense dramas which had been critical successes but hadn't made money. Kramer agreed to buy the project provided they would change the setting to America. Rose agreed, and he and his wife Tania wrote the screenplay. Released in 1963, the film became the biggest box-office hit of Rose's career.

See also
 BFI Top 100 British films

References

Notes

Bibliography

 

 
 
 
 
  ("from the screenplay by William Rose").

External links
 
 
 

1953 films
1950s sports comedy films
British auto racing films
1950s comedy road movies
British sports comedy films
Fictional cars
Films directed by Henry Cornelius
Films set in Brighton
Films set in London
Films shot at Pinewood Studios
British comedy road movies
Best British Film BAFTA Award winners
1953 comedy films
1950s English-language films
1950s British films